Paul Beavers (born 2 October 1978) is a former professional footballer who played in The Football League for Shrewsbury Town, Oldham Athletic, Hartlepool United and Darlington.

References

English footballers
English expatriate footballers
Darlington F.C. players
Hartlepool United F.C. players
Oldham Athletic A.F.C. players
Shrewsbury Town F.C. players
Sunderland A.F.C. players
English Football League players
1978 births
Living people
Association football forwards
English expatriate sportspeople in Ireland
Expatriate association footballers in the Republic of Ireland